Thunderstorm asthma (also referred to in the media as thunder fever or a pollen bomb) is the triggering of an asthma attack by environmental conditions directly caused by a local thunderstorm. It has been proposed that during a thunderstorm, pollen grains can absorb moisture and then burst into much smaller fragments with these fragments being easily dispersed by wind. While larger pollen grains are usually filtered by hairs in the nose, the smaller pollen fragments are able to pass through and enter the lungs, triggering the asthma attack.

History
The phenomenon has been recognised for a significant period of time with a study of an event in Birmingham, England, noting the correlation between thunderstorms and hospitalisations. This fact that these were not isolated events and were part of an ongoing pattern of events is clearly documented in the review "Thunderstorm asthma, an overview of the evidence base". A significant impetus in the study of the phenomenon occurred after an event in 2016 in Melbourne, Australia. Since then there have been further reports of widespread thunderstorm asthma in Wagga Wagga, Australia; London, England; Naples, Italy; Atlanta, United States; and Ahvaz, Iran. The outbreak in Melbourne, in November 2016, that overwhelmed the ambulance system and some local hospitals, resulted in at least nine deaths. There was a similar incident in Kuwait in early December, 2016 with at least 5 deaths and many admissions to the ICU.

Statistics
Many of those affected during a thunderstorm asthma outbreak may have never experienced an asthma attack before.

It has been found 95% of those that were affected by thunderstorm asthma had a history of hayfever, and 96% of those people had tested positive to grass pollen allergies, particularly rye grass. A rye grass pollen grain can hold up to 700 tiny starch granules, measuring 0.6 to 2.5 μm, small enough to reach the lower airways in the lung.

Prevention 
Patients with a history of grass allergies should be tested for asthma and treated for the grass allergies and asthma if also present. Patients with known asthma should be treated and counseled on the importance of adherence to preventative medication protocols. Preventative treatment found useful for severe asthma includes Allergen immunotherapy (AIT) particularly sublingual immunotherapy (SLIT).

Significant events
 
 
 
 
 
 
 
 
 
  and Riyadh, Saudi Arabia

References

Asthma
History of Birmingham, West Midlands
History of Melbourne
Weather and health